Pasargad District formerly known as Hakhamanish District, is a district (bakhsh) in Pasargad County, Fars Province, Iran. At the 2006 census, its population was 6,171, in 1,460 families.  "Hakhamanish" is the modern Persian version of Achaemenes, the founder of the ancient Persian Achaemenid Dynasty. The District has one city Madar-e Soleyman.  The District has two rural districts (dehestan): Abu ol Verdi Rural District and Madar Soleyman Rural District.

References 

Pasargad County
Districts of Fars Province